Christopher David Patton is an American voice actor who has worked on a number of English-language versions of Japanese anime series that have been dubbed by ADV Films, Funimation, and Sentai Filmworks. Some of his major roles at ADV include Sousuke Sagara in Full Metal Panic!, Ikki Minami in Air Gear, Ayato Kamina in RahXephon, Fakir in Princess Tutu, Hajime Aoyama in Ghost Stories, and Tatsuhiro Sato in Welcome to the N.H.K..  At Funimation, he voiced Greed in Fullmetal Alchemist, Turles in Dragon Ball Z: The Tree of Might, Graham Specter in Baccano!, Manabu Yuuki in The Galaxy Railways, Creed Diskenth in Black Cat, Asura in Soul Eater, and Agito in Origin: Spirits of the Past. With Sentai, he voiced Keima Katsuragi in The World God Only Knows.

Personal life
Patton was born in Houston, Texas. He moved to Annapolis, Maryland, in 2013, and occasionally flew back to Houston to perform some roles for anime. He moved back to Houston in 2015 and would eventually move to Los Angeles in 2018. Patton is gay, having come out publicly during an interview in 2013.

Filmography

Anime

Film

Live-action

Video games

References

External links
 Official website (last updated 2013)
 Chris Patton at Voice123.com
 
 
 Chris Patton at Crystal Acids
 
 
 Book Voice Over Chris Patton

1971 births
Living people
American gay actors
American male voice actors
American male video game actors
Funimation
LGBT people from Maryland
LGBT people from Texas
Male actors from Houston
People from Annapolis, Maryland
Male actors from Maryland
21st-century American male actors
20th-century American male actors
Audiobook narrators
21st-century LGBT people
20th-century LGBT people